Malibu's Most Wanted is a 2003 American comedy film written by and starring Jamie Kennedy and co-starring Taye Diggs, Anthony Anderson, Blair Underwood, Regina Hall, Damien Dante Wayans, Ryan O'Neal, and Snoop Dogg. The film is written by the creators of MADtv, Fax Bahr and Adam Small, who also serve as producers. The character of "B-Rad" (a spoof of Eminem's character "B-Rabbit" in the film 8 Mile) originally appeared in Jamie Kennedy's hidden-camera show The Jamie Kennedy Experiment,  but started in his stand-up routine when he was starting out; here, "B-Rad" is Brad, the son of Senator Bill Gluckman who is running for governor of California and fears his son is a distraction on the campaign trail, with Brad's aspirations of becoming a rapper and his glamorization of gang life. To that end, Gluckman’s campaign manager hires two actors to stage an abduction to bring Brad to an inner city neighborhood where he will learn to behave himself.

Plot
The film centers on the family life of Bill Gluckman, a wealthy Jewish senator from Malibu, California who is running for the office of governor of California. His son Brad is a wannabe "Eminem", preferring to go by the nickname "B-Rad" despite leading a rich, sheltered life. As a result, members of Mr. Gluckman's political campaign become concerned that Brad's idiotic, outlandish behavior will ruin his father's chances at being elected.

The campaign team members hire two actors, Sean and PJ, who don't know any more about inner-city life than B-Rad, to act as gang members. They kidnap him, and take him to South Los Angeles, where PJ's cousin Shondra lives, and they hope B-Rad will be "scared white" after witnessing what inner city life is really like. The trio engages in mildly dangerous activities such as petty theft in order to convince B-Rad that he should return home.

The three involuntarily become mixed up between rival gangs, unfortunately crossing paths with the leader of one of the gangs, Tec, after bumping into him at a club, and who also happens to be Shondra’s ex. In the meantime, B-Rad develops feelings for Shondra, who at first is unimpressed and annoyed, but slowly begins to enjoy B-Rad's company, and eventually admire him for who he truly is.

B-Rad comes to find out that the entire excursion to head to South Central was a ruse in order for him to be scared out of his mannerisms, and soon takes matters into his own hands, turning the tables on his would-be captors. His recklessness leads to the trio becoming actually kidnapped by Tec and his crew, unbeknownst to B-Rad, who just assumes this is part of the act. Tec soon becomes impressed at intimidation tactics portrayed by B-Rad as a result of playing Grand Theft Auto. Unfortunately, during a house party, B-Rad almost gets shot by Tec for a misunderstanding with Shondra (he accidentally shot himself in the foot, yet it barely grazed him due to his poor aim). When Bill Gluckman realizes that his son is in actual danger, he rushes over, and uses his trademark negotiating skills in order to ease the situation. In doing so, he realizes that he should just accept B-Rad for who he is, and decides that he will support his son unconditionally. The two reconcile, and when the family returns to Malibu, the film closes with Bill and B-Rad celebrating a Gluckman win in the governors' race.

Cast

Cameos
 Mike Epps as D.J. Johnny Powell
 Felli Fel as "Felli"
 Hi-C as "C"
 Young Dre The Truth as "Dre" 
 Drop da Bomb as "Bomb"
 Hal Fishman as Mr. Hal 
 Big Boy as Biggs

Reception

Cultural themes
The overarching themes that are discussed in Malibu's Most Wanted are both the exploitation of one culture by another, as well as the pressure to act within the norms of a given culture. Not only are these themes explored explicitly by the actions of B-Rad, but also by Sean and PJ. There is an expectation of how black people are portrayed in Hollywood that is explored in depth in the manner in which Sean and PJ practice acting "gangsta" in order to prove their blackness. In an interview conducted by Brian Balchack from Movieweb.com, Taye Diggs notes that "the interesting thing, being an African-American actor, is that we're constantly challenged with the duality of acting stereotypically “black,” and just acting. Matt Damon and Ben Affleck don't have to read for a role and ask themselves, ‘Okay, do they want me to say this word like this, or can I just be myself?' I know tons of black actors that didn't grow up in the ‘hood, and don't have their “gangster lingo” down, who take it to another level when they go in for a gangster role. I think that that's very interesting."

Home media
Malibu's Most Wanted was released on VHS and DVD on September 9, 2003.

See also
 Malibu's Most Wanted (soundtrack)

References

External links
 

2003 films
2000s hip hop films
2000s buddy comedy films
2000s teen comedy films
2003 comedy films
American buddy comedy films
American teen comedy films
2000s English-language films
American gang films
Films about race and ethnicity
Films directed by John Whitesell
Films set in Los Angeles
Films set in Malibu, California
Films with screenplays by Nick Swardson
Hood comedy films
Warner Bros. films
2000s American films